The 2008 World Wheelchair Curling Championship was held from February 2 to 9 at the Eishalle Sursee in Sursee, Switzerland.

Qualification
 (Host country)
Top seven finishers from the 2007 World Wheelchair Curling Championship (not including host):

 Top teams from qualifying event:

Qualification event

Two teams outside of the top finishers, Sweden and Italy, qualified from a qualifying event held in November 2007 in Inverness, Scotland.

Teams

Round-robin standings

Round-robin results

Draw 1
Saturday, February 2, 18:00

Draw 2
Monday, February 3, 10:00

Draw 3
Monday, February 3, 15:30

Draw 4
Tuesday, February 4, 10:00

Draw 5
Tuesday, February 4, 15:30

Draw 6
Wednesday, February 5, 10:00

Draw 7
Wednesday, February 5, 15:30

Draw 8
Thursday, February 6, 10:00

Draw 9
Thursday, February 6, 15:30

Tiebreaker
Thursday, February 7, 13:30

Playoffs

1 vs. 2 Game
Friday, February 8, 10:00

3 vs. 4 Game
Friday, February 8, 10:00

Semifinal
Friday, February 8, 15:30

Bronze medal game
Saturday, February 9, 10:00

Gold medal game
Saturday, February 9, 11:00

External links

Results at Curlit.com

World Wheelchair Curling Championship
2008 in curling
2008 in Swedish sport
International curling competitions hosted by Sweden